Amira Kiziamina, known better by his stage name Kalash Criminel, is a French rapper. He is albino and chooses to wear a balaclava, because when his musical activities began, he had to hide his face as his mother did not want him to rap. However, he received positive reactions for wearing the balaclava, and now wears it by choice. He is signed to Def Jam Recordings and Universal Music. He collaborates often with Kaaris, with whom he notably made the song "Arrêt du Cœur" on his album R.A.S.

Biography 
Kalash Criminel was born in Zaïre, now known as the Democratic Republic of the Congo on 14 February 1995. Initially, he lived in Kinshasa with his family, but with the onset of the First Congo War, he and his family fled to France. He and his family arrived in Rougemont, in Sevran and have been living there since. In his youth, he began to rap, initially becoming a part of the group Hall 14 avec les rappeurs Daystiil, Kifa, Krimo JS et Zino5. This group was later signed to the label 10/12 Records. In 2012, they released a demo, titled Traumatiser, which solidified their collaboration and work.

In 2015, Kiziamina began his solo career and released the song "10 12 14 Bureau", and subsequently released a series of freestyles titled Sauvagerie. He subsequently collaborated with rappers Ixzo, Sofiane, Kaaris et JUL.

His collaboration with Kaaris yielded the song "Arrêt du cœur" which guaranteed and launched his career in French rap. On 23 September 2016, he released his first music video titled "Sale Sonorité". This video has in excess of 10 million views on YouTube. On 26 September 2016, he announced the release of his first mixtape, titled R.A.S., which was slated for release on 28 October 2016. In its first week, R.A.S sold 2,970 copies.

On 23 November 2018, Kiziamina released his first studio album, La Fosse aux lions, under his label, Sale sonorité Records. Response was favourable, with 13,388 copies sold in the first week.

Discography

Mixtapes

Singles

*Did not appear in the official Belgian Ultratop 50 charts, but rather in the bubbling under Ultratip charts.

Other charted songs

*Did not appear in the official Belgian Ultratop 50 charts, but rather in the bubbling under Ultratip charts.

Featured in

*Did not appear in the official Belgian Ultratop 50 charts, but rather in the bubbling under Ultratip charts.

References

French rappers
Living people
French people of Democratic Republic of the Congo descent
Rappers from Seine-Saint-Denis
People with albinism
Year of birth missing (living people)